A social film is a type of interactive film that is presented through the lens of social media. A social film is distributed digitally and integrates with a social networking service, such as Facebook or Google+. It combines features of web video, social network games and social media.

Key elements 
Social films are a recent phenomenon and, in turn, there are few precedents for their format. Regardless, the medium has certain identifiable elements:
Casual entertainment
Social media
User-generated content
Game mechanics

Using a combination of these factors, a social film engages viewers to interact directly with the work, be it through social media functionality like comments and ranking or adding directly to the narrative itself.

Just as with memes, social film distribution relies on the viral spread enabled by social media. This is based on the viral expansion loops model, in which a viewer benefits from sharing the application with friends, exponentially creating new viewers compelled to share the application.

History 
The first social film, Him, Her and Them was produced and released by Murmur in April 2011. It was distributed exclusively through Facebook and promoted as the first “Facebook film.” The film is composed of short video clips and interactive slideshows, integrating Facebook's Social Graph API. Users participate via text-based additions to the story which are viewable only by friends within their social network.

Other examples of social film include lonelygirl15, which used YouTube posts to create an interactive video series about a fictional character, and Ron Howard's Project Imagin8ion, where a photo contest was used as the basis for a short film.  
 
In July 2011, Intel and Toshiba partnered together to create Hollywood's first Social Film experience, a thriller called Inside, directed by D.J. Caruso and starring Emmy Rossum. The project is broken up into several segments across multiple social media platforms including Facebook, YouTube, and Twitter. In this instance, the audience is challenged to help Emmy Rossum's character, Christina, safely make it out of the room she's been trapped in. This particular form of social film is a major undertaking in that it combines social media activity with A-list acting talent to create a user experience that all happens in real time.  
 
Although not quite the same idea, Hollywood has been experimenting with the idea of interactive and crowd-sourced films. For example, Ridley Scott's Life in a Day, is a documentary style feature, which strives to be the largest crowd-sourced feature film ever created.

In August 2012, Intel and Toshiba partnered again to create The Beauty Inside, directed by Drake Doremus, starring Mary Elizabeth Winstead and Topher Grace. It's Hollywood's first social film that gives everyone in the audience a chance to play Alex, the lead role. The experience will be broken up into six filmed episodes interspersed with real-time interactive storytelling that all takes place on Alex's Facebook timeline.

In August 2013, Intel and Toshiba released their third entry into the category, The Power Inside, directed by Will Speck and Josh Gordon and starring Harvey Keitel, Analeigh Tipton, and Craig Roberts. It's Hollywood's first social film that asks the audience to audition to help save or destroy the world. The experience is broken up into six filmed episodes interspersed with user-generated content and interactive storytelling on the main character's Facebook timeline.

In 2015, Intel partnered with Dell for their fourth entry, What Lives Inside directed by Robert Stromberg and starring Colin Hanks, Catherine O'Hara, and J. K. Simmons. The first of four episodes was released on Hulu on March 25, 2015.

References 

Film genres
Social media